Silverback Gorilla 2 is the sixth studio album by American rapper Sheek Louch. The album was released on December 4, 2015, by Tommy Boy Entertainment. The album features guest appearances from Billy Danze, Trae tha Truth, Joell Ortiz, Swizz Beatz, Raheem DeVaughn, Pusha T, Dyce Payne, Jadakiss, ASAP Ferg, Styles P, Ghostface Killah, Fabolous and Whispers.

Track listing

Charts

References

2015 albums
Sheek Louch albums
Sequel albums